California's 34th congressional district is a U.S. congressional district in California. Located in Los Angeles County, the district is represented by Democrat Jimmy Gomez. Its previous U.S. representative, Democrat Xavier Becerra of Los Angeles, resigned January 24, 2017, to become attorney general of California. Representative Gomez won a special election on June 6, 2017, beating fellow Democrat Robert Lee Ahn to replace Becerra. He was later sworn in as the district's U.S. representative on July 11, 2017.

The district is almost entirely within the City of Los Angeles and includes the following neighborhoods in Central, East, and Northeast Los Angeles: Boyle Heights, Chinatown, City Terrace, Cypress Park, Downtown Los Angeles, Eagle Rock, El Sereno, Garvanza, Glassell Park, Highland Park, Koreatown, Little Bangladesh, Little Tokyo, Lincoln Heights, Montecito Heights, Monterey Hills, Mount Washington, and Westlake.

Competitiveness

In statewide races

Composition

As of the 2020 redistricting, California's 34th congressional district is located in Southern California. The district is almost entirely within the city of Los Angeles.

Los Angeles County is split between this district, the 28th district, the 30th district, the 37th district, the 38th district, and the 42nd district. The 34th and 28th are partitioned by Colorado Blvd, Lantana Dr, Church St, Adelaide Pl, Highway 110, N Huntingdon Dr, S Winchester Ave, Valley Blvd, Laguna Channel, Highway 710, l-10 Express Ln, Rollins Dr, Floral Dr, E Colonia, Belvedere Park, Highway 60, S Atlantic Blvd, and Pomona Blvd.

The 34th, 37th and 30th are partitioned by S Alameda St, E 7th St, Harbor Freeway, Highway 10, S Normandie Ave, W Pico Blvd, Crenshaw Blvd, Wilshire Blvd, S Van Ness Ave, S Wilton Pl, N Wilton Pl, Beverly Blvd, N Western Ave, Melrose Ave, Hollywood Freeway, Douglas St, Lilac Ter, N Boylston St, Academy Rd, Pasadena Freeway, Highway 5, Duvall St, Blake Ave, Fernleaf St, Crystal St, Blake Ave, Meadowvale Ave, Los Angeles, Benedict St, N Coolidge Ave, Glendale Freeway, Roswell St, Delay Dr, Fletcher Dr, Southern Pacific Railroad, S Glendale Ave, Vista Superba Dr, Verdugo Rd, Plumas St, Carr Park, Harvey Dr, and Eagle Rock Hilside Park.

The 34th, 38th and 42nd are partitioned by S Gerhart Ave, Simmons Ave, Dewar Ave, W Beverly Blvd, Repetto Ave, Allston St, S Concourse Ave, Ferguson Dr, Simmons Ave/S Gerhart Ave, Highway 72, Goodrich Blvd, Telegraph Rd, S Marianna Ave, Noakes St, S Bonnie Beach Pl, Union Pacific Ave, S Indiana St, Union Pacific Railroad, Holabird Ave, S Grande Vista Ave, AT & SF Railway, Harriet St, and E 25th St. The 34th district takes in the Los Angeles neighborhoods of Boyle Heights, Lincoln Heights, Naud Junction, El Sereno, Highland Park, Glassell Park, Mount Washington, Eagle Rock, and Garvanza, as well as the census-designated place East Los Angeles.

Cities & CDP with 10,000 or more people
 Los Angeles - 3,898,747
 East Los Angeles - 118,786

List of members representing the district

Election results

1962

1964

1966

1968

1970

1972

1974

1976

1978

1980

1982

1984

1986

1988

1990

1992

1994

1996

1998

2000

2002

2004

2006

2008

2010

2012

2014

2016

2017 (Special)

2018

2020

2022

Historical district boundaries
From 2003 through 2013, the district consisted of parts of downtown Los Angeles, including Downey, Bellflower and Maywood. Due to redistricting after the 2010 United States Census, the district pivoted north east within Los Angeles County and still includes downtown Los Angeles and areas north east.

See also
List of United States congressional districts

References

External links
California's 34th congressional district, GovTrack.US
RAND California Election Returns: District Definitions
California Voter Foundation map - CD34

34
Government of Los Angeles County, California
Government of Los Angeles
Central Los Angeles
Eastside Los Angeles
Northeast Los Angeles
Boyle Heights, Los Angeles
Chinatown, Los Angeles
Downtown Los Angeles
Cypress Park, Los Angeles
Eagle Rock, Los Angeles
El Sereno, Los Angeles
Glassell Park, Los Angeles
Highland Park, Los Angeles
Koreatown, Los Angeles
Lincoln Heights, Los Angeles
Little Tokyo, Los Angeles
Los Angeles River
Montecito Heights, Los Angeles
Mount Washington, Los Angeles
Westlake, Los Angeles
Constituencies established in 1963
1963 establishments in California